Wanapum Lake is a reservoir on the Columbia River in the U.S. state of Washington. It was created in 1963 with the construction of Wanapum Dam. It stretches from there upstream to the Rock Island Dam. The lake is named for the Wanapum people.

See also
 List of dams in the Columbia River watershed

References

1963 establishments in Washington (state)
Infrastructure completed in 1963
Buildings and structures in Grant County, Washington
Columbia River
Lakes of Chelan County, Washington
Lakes of Douglas County, Washington
Lakes of Grant County, Washington
Lakes of Kittitas County, Washington
Protected areas of Chelan County, Washington
Protected areas of Douglas County, Washington
Protected areas of Grant County, Washington
Reservoirs in Washington (state)